Febris Erotica is the second EP by the Russian power metal band Catharsis. It was released in 1999 by Isolated Records. In 2004, the EP, together with the Dea album, was released by Irond.

Track listing
"Silentium"  – 1:25
"Febris Erotica"  – 5:31
"Towards the Acme"  – 4:49
"Taedium Vitae (part I)"  – 6:20
"Taedium Vitae Part II"  – 3:57

The EP also contains 3 bonus video tracks:

"The Making of Febris Erotica"
"My Love the Phiery (live)"
"A Trip Into Elysium (live)"

Members
Andrey Kapachov - vocals
Igor Polyakov - rhythm guitar, acoustic guitar
Julia Red - keyboards, sound effects
Anthony Arikh - lead guitar, acoustic guitar
Vladimir Muchnov - drums
Roman Senkin - bass

Catharsis (Russian band) albums
1999 EPs